Sugar transporter SWEET1, also known as RAG1-activating protein 1 and stromal cell protein (SCP), is a membrane protein that in humans is encoded by the SLC50A1 gene. SWEET1 is the sole transporter from the SLC50 (SWEET) gene family present in the genomes of most animal species, with the exception of the nematode Caenorhabditis elegans, which has seven.

SWEET1 is a broadly-expressed glucose transporter. As the SWEET family has been identified relatively recently, the full range of its functions in animals is not yet clear. However, the bovine SLC50A1 homologue is associated with lactose concentration in milk, and the CiRGA homologue in the sea squirt Ciona intestinalis is essential for tissue differentiation during embryogenesis, especially the development of the notochord.
SWEET genes are common in plant genomes, with around twenty paralogues  functioning as both sucrose and hexose transporters, and are also associated with pathogen susceptibility.

References

Further reading 

 
 
 
 

Solute carrier family